Clarence High School may refer to: 

 Clarence High School (Bellerive, Tasmania), Australia
 Clarence High School (India)
 Clarence High School (Clarence, New York), United States